Ethel May Jacobson (6 September 1877 – 14 June 1965) was a New Zealand teacher, newspaper editor and manager, journalist . She was born in Lyttelton, North Canterbury, New Zealand on 6 September 1877.

References

1877 births
1965 deaths
New Zealand educators
New Zealand journalists
People from Lyttelton, New Zealand
Nelson College for Girls faculty